Lonerider is the debut album by the Australian band The Anyones. It was released in 2000 on Shock Records. It was recorded in the winter of 1999 at Hothouse Studios in St Kilda, Victoria.

Track listing

Personnel
 Malcolm Pinkerton - Guitar, vocals
 Steve Pinkerton - Drums, vocals
 Nick Murphy - Bass, vocals
 Adrian Gardner - Guitar, vocals

Notes
The track Are You Ready featured a guest guitar solo from Midnight Oil guitarist Martin Rotsey.

2000 debut albums
The Anyones albums